Artillery has been a primary weapon of war since before the Napoleonic Era. Several countries have developed and built artillery systems, while artillery itself has been continually improved and redesigned to meet the evolving needs of the battlefield. This has led to a plethora of different types and designs which have played a role in the history of warfare and continue to be a significant factor in modern combat.

The following list of artillery cover guns, howitzers, mortars, and other large projectile weapons. Small arms and missiles are not included, though artillery rockets and other bombardment weapons are. This list is ordered by name or designation in alpha-numeric order.

 For other categorized lists, see list of artillery by country and list of artillery by type.

Artillery

See also 
 Artillery
 List of artillery by country
 List of World War II artillery
 List of naval guns
 List of weapons
 List of tank main guns
 Glossary of British ordnance terms

Infantry support weapons
 List of grenade launchers
 List of recoilless rifles

Artillery
Name

bn:গোলন্দাজ অস্ত্রের তালিকা
ja:自走砲一覧
tr:Obüsler listesi
zh:火炮列表